Marc Giraudon (born July 22, 1980 in Vierzon) is a French football defender who played for several years in Ligue 2.

Career
Giraudon played in 230 Ligue 2 matches over 11 seasons with LB Châteauroux, Clermont Foot and Stade Reims. Giraudon was a key part of Châteauroux's run to the 2003–04 Coupe de France final, however one week before the final he suffered an ankle injury and missed the match.

References

External links 

1980 births
Living people
People from Vierzon
French footballers
Association football defenders
LB Châteauroux players
Clermont Foot players
Stade de Reims players
Sportspeople from Cher (department)
Footballers from Centre-Val de Loire